"Elastic Heart" is a song written by Australian singer Sia, featuring Canadian singer the Weeknd and American record producer Diplo, for the soundtrack of The Hunger Games: Catching Fire, a film based on the novel of the same name by Suzanne Collins. Andrew Swanson assisted the artists in writing the song, with production handled by Diplo and US producer Greg Kurstin. It was released on 1 October 2013 as a single from Catching Fire by RCA, Republic and Lionsgate. "Elastic Heart" peaked at number 7 on the singles chart of New Zealand and was certified gold by the Recorded Music NZ. It also appeared on the charts of Australia, Belgium, Switzerland and the United Kingdom.

In 2014, Sia re-recorded a solo version of "Elastic Heart" for her sixth studio album 1000 Forms of Fear. The solo version was released in 2015 as a single from the album and was accompanied by a controversial music video that features actor Shia LaBeouf and dancer Maddie Ziegler. The clip was the eighth most viewed YouTube music video in 2015, while the single peaked within the top 10 in Australia and the United Kingdom, and the top 20 in the United States.

Release and composition

"Elastic Heart" was released as the second single from the soundtrack for The Hunger Games: Catching Fire (2013). The song was made available for digital download on 1 October 2013. It was sent to US rhythmic contemporary radio by RCA Records, Republic Records and Lionsgate Films on 8 October 2013.

A power ballad, Hilary Hughes of The Village Voice named "Elastic Heart" a "grand, full electropop production," while Aimee Cliff from Fact characterised the song as "a pop song that bounces like rubber." Meanwhile, Rolling Stone reviewer Julianne Shepherd called it a trap song. Its lyrics address "the overwhelming strength Sia needed to convince herself that life was worth living after coming out of a crushing relationship." Having the chord progression of D–A–E–F♯m, the song is composed in the key of A major and a tempo of 65/130 beats per minute.

Reception
Blue Sullivan of Slant Magazine wrote that "'Elastic Heart' is a seamless and highly successful team-up that reads like a grimier after-market version of Lady Gaga's 'Do What U Want'." Spin magazine's Chris Martins stated that "Sia soared" and it was a "bubbling ballad," and Bradley Stern of MuuMuse claimed it was "a perfectly chaotic combination." "Elastic Heart" debuted at number 67 on the Australian ARIA Singles Charts on the chart issue dated 14 October 2013. The single also charted at number 27 on the Walloon Ultratip, and number 36 in Switzerland. The song fared better in New Zealand, peaking at number 7 on the national singles chart and was certified gold by the Recorded Music NZ (RMNZ). In the United Kingdom, "Elastic Heart" debuted at number 79 on the UK Singles Chart on 12 October 2013. On 17 January 2015, the single re-entered the chart at number 61.

Credits and personnel

 Songwriting, lead vocals – Sia Furler, Thomas Wesley Pentz, Andrew Swanson
 Producing – Greg Kurstin, Diplo
 Engineering – Greg Kurstin
 Additional engineering – Alex Pasco
 Vocal recording – Rob Kleiner
 Mixing – Manny Marroquin
 Additional mixing – Chris Galland, Delbert Bowers
 Mastering – Brian "Big Bass" Gardner
 Drum programming – Andrew Swanson, Diplo

Credits for "Elastic Heart" are adapted from The Hunger Games: Catching Fire soundtrack digital inlay cover.

Charts and certifications

Weekly charts

Year-end charts

Certifications

Release history

Sia solo version

In 2014, Sia recorded a solo version of "Elastic Heart" for her sixth studio album, 1000 Forms of Fear. It was released on 9 January 2015 by RCA as the third single from the album. Annie Zaleski from The A.V. Club labelled "Elastic Heart" a "striking power ballad," while AllMusic's Heather Phares picked the song as one of the three standouts from the album, alongside "Chandelier" and "Eye of the Needle". Aimee Cliff from Fact named it a "great example of how only Sia can truly rock a song written for (rather than by) Sia." The deluxe version of 1000 Forms of Fear includes a piano version of the song.

In Italy, "Elastic Heart" impacted contemporary hit radio on 9 January 2015. "Elastic Heart" debuted at number 8 on the ARIA Singles Chart on the chart issue dated 19 January 2015. The following week, the song rose to number 5. The Australian Recording Industry Association certified it 3× Platinum, which denotes shipments exceeding 210,000 copies in Australia. In the United States, "Elastic Heart" debuted at number 17 on the Billboard Hot 100 on the issue chart dated 24 January 2015, becoming the week's "Hot Shot Debut". The song was later certified double platinum for combined sales and streaming of 2 million units in the United States. In the United Kingdom, the single peaked at number 10 on the UK Singles Chart on 5 April 2015 and has since been certified double platinum by the British Phonographic Industry.

Music video

On 7 January 2015, the music video for the song was released. Directed by Sia and Daniel Askill, shot by cinematographer Sebastian Wintero and choreographed by Ryan Heffington, the video features Maddie Ziegler, who recently appeared in the video for Sia's single "Chandelier" and "Big Girls Cry", and actor Shia LaBeouf. In the video, Ziegler and LaBeouf perform an interpretive dance in nude and dirt-smeared outfits. Justine Harman from Elle likened the concept of the video to the plot of Titanic. Jason Lipshutz from Billboard summarised: "The entirety of the video features the surprising pair interpreting the song through different body contortions: they dance-fight, collapse in the middle of the cage, crawl toward and away from each other, and make some wildly fantastic facial expressions."

The video was nominated for the 2015 VMA Award for Best Female Video. Billboard selected the video as one "of the 10 best music videos of 2015 (so far)", as did PopCrush, commenting that the video's "lopsided choreography and filthy warfare yields a raw, junkyard beauty that doesn't ask who will make it out alive, but whether escape is ever really on the table." New York magazine's Vulture.com ranked it number 6 on its list of 2015's top 10 music videos. As of March 2023, the video had received more than 1.2 billion views on YouTube. It was the eighth most viewed YouTube video in 2015.

Controversy
The video "courted controversy and plaudits in equal measure", with some commentators perceiving it to have pedophilic undertones because it features an adult and child dancing together clad only in beige dancewear. 
Sia explained that the two dancers represented "warring 'Sia' self states," but she apologized on Twitter to anyone who was upset by the video:
I anticipated some "pedophelia!!!" Cries for this video. All I can say is Maddie and Shia are two of the only actors I felt could play, these two warring 'Sia' self states. I apologize to those who feel triggered by "Elastic Heart". My intention was to create some emotional content, not to upset anybody.

Live performances
On 17 January 2015, Sia performed "Elastic Heart" on Saturday Night Live with Kevin Hart hosting and Maddie Ziegler and Denna Thomsen dancing. For the performance, Sia sang the song with a short black veil covering the top half of her face, while Ziegler and Thomsen recreated the dance routine in the music video wearing nude leotards and blonde wigs. Later that month, Sia made a live rendition of the song on The Ellen DeGeneres Show. She also performed the song on The Voice UK on 28 March and The Voice US on 7 April 2015. Sia also performed this song on the Nostalgic for the Present Tour in 2016.

Charts

Weekly charts

Year-end charts

Certifications

Release history

See also
 List of number-one dance singles of 2015 (U.S.)

References

External links
 

2010s ballads
2013 singles
2013 songs
Sia (musician) songs
Number-one singles in Poland
Song recordings produced by Diplo
Songs written by Sia (musician)
Electropop ballads
The Hunger Games music
The Weeknd songs
2015 singles
Songs written by Diplo
Songs written by the Weeknd
Songs written for films
Music video controversies
Music videos directed by Daniel Askill
Obscenity controversies in music
Songs about dreams
Songs about depression
RCA Records singles
Republic Records singles